The Waratah Football Club, nicknamed, Warriors or Tahs, is a member club of the Northern Territory Football League.

Club achievements

History
The club was formed in November 1916, and was one of the original foundation clubs. Waratah is the only Club with an involvement in every year the competition has been played in Darwin.

The Waratah FC has won 15 League Premierships (including 3 consecutive Premierships from 1928/29 to 1930/31) 12 Reserves Premierships and 2 Under 18 Premierships.

The League side broke a 21-year drought in the 1998/99 season to win the League Premiership and followed this up with a back-to-back Premiership in 1999/2000. The Reserve Grade won the Premiership for 3 consecutive years over this period with Premiership wins in 1997/98, 1998/99 and 1999/2000, and again last season.

The prestigious AFLNT Nichols Medal has been won by 8 legends of the Club, with one of these players to have won dual medals. Denis Ganley 1951/52, Bluey McKee 1952/53, Bill James 1953/54, Jim Wilson 1960/61, Bertram Kantilla 1962/63, Keith Nickels 1971/72, Hank McPhee 1979/80, Peter Ivanoff 1981/82 and 1986/87.

Notable Waratah players in the AFL such as Essendon's Dean Rioli.

Club song

External links

Official website
Full Points Footy Profile for Waratah Football Club

Sport in Darwin, Northern Territory
Australian rules football clubs in the Northern Territory
1916 establishments in Australia
Australian rules football clubs established in 1916